Assara holophragma is a species of moth of the  family Pyralidae. It is found in Australia.

References

Phycitini
Moths of Australia
Moths described in 1887